Barwa Barauli is a village in West Champaran district in the Indian state of Bihar. It is located in the Narkatiaganj block.

Demographics
 India census, Barwa Barauli had a population of 5008 in 795 households. Males constitute 53.1% of the population and females 46.8%. Barwa Barauli has an average literacy rate of 50.57%, lower than the national average of 74%: male literacy is 63.6%, and female literacy is 36.3%. In Barwa Barauli, 21.82% of the population is under 6 years of age.

References

Villages in West Champaran district